Bendita, formerly Bendita TV, is an Argentine talk show, aired by Canal 9. Journalist Lola Cordero is a regular panelist.

Awards
 2013 Tato Awards for best TV programs of spectacles.

References

External links
 
https://web.archive.org/web/20110625024329/http://www.benditatv.com.ar/ (in Spanish)

Archive television shows
Argentine television talk shows
El Nueve original programming
2006 Argentine television series debuts